Victoire Monnier (born December 20, 1982 in Boulogne-Billancourt), professionally known by her stage name Keny Arkana, is an Argentine-French rapper who is active in the alter-globalization and civil disobedience movements. In 2004 she founded a music collective called , in the neighborhood of Noailles, Marseille.

Biography

Arkana was born on 20 December 1982 to an Argentine family in Boulogne-Billancourt, France, and raised in Marseille. Arkana began writing songs at the age of 12, and began rapping publicly about two years later.

She later founded a hip hop music group called Mars Patrie, followed by another called Etat-Major. Her status in the French hip hop circles of Marseille  rose, and in 2003 Etat-Major released their debut mixtape.

Arkana released her first solo EP, Le missile est lancé ("The rocket is launched") in 2004. She released her first album, Entre ciment et belle étoile ("Between concrete and stars"), in October 2006. Her first single, La rage (2006), comments on the 2005 civil unrest in France.

Keny Arkana also launched a series of local social fora through the association Appel aux sans voix ("Call to the voiceless").

Her later studio albums include L'Esquisse 2 (May 2011) and Tout tourne autour du soleil (December 2012).

Discography

Albums
Solo

EPs
As Etat-Major
 2003: Volume 1 (EP)
Solo
 2004: Le missile est lancé (EP)
 2006: La rage (EP)
 2016: Etat d'urgence  (EP)

Notes

External links
 

1982 births
Alter-globalization
Living people
French women rappers
French people of Argentine descent
Argentine women rappers
Culture of Marseille
21st-century rappers
21st-century women rappers
Because Music artists